The 1990–91 Gamma Ethniki was the eighth season since the official establishment of the third tier of Greek football in 1983. Doxa Vyronas and Naoussa were crowned champions in Southern and Northern Group respectively, thus winning promotion to Beta Ethniki. Egaleo and Trikala also won promotion as a runners-up of the groups.

Olympiakos Loutraki, Ethnikos Asteras, Irodotos, Acharnaikos, Panarkadikos, Lamia, Odysseas Kordelio, Anagennisi Karditsa, Aspida Xanthi and Kilkisiakos were relegated to Delta Ethniki.

Southern Group

League table

Northern Group

League table

References

Third level Greek football league seasons
3
Greece